Mexalictus is a genus of sweat bees in the family Halictidae. There are more than 20 described species in Mexalictus.

Species
These 22 species belong to the genus Mexalictus:

 Mexalictus albofasciatus Dumesh, 2013
 Mexalictus anatolii Dumesh, 2013
 Mexalictus arizonensis Eickwort, 1978 (Arizona mexalictus)
 Mexalictus astriatus Dumesh, 2013
 Mexalictus ayalai Dumesh, 2013
 Mexalictus benyamini Dumesh, 2013
 Mexalictus diversus Dumesh, 2013
 Mexalictus eickworti Godínez-García, 1996
 Mexalictus genalis Dumesh, 2013
 Mexalictus gibbsi Dumesh, 2013
 Mexalictus guatemalensis Dumesh, 2013
 Mexalictus hansoni Dumesh, 2013
 Mexalictus jovelus Dumesh, 2013
 Mexalictus mexicanus Eickwort, 1978
 Mexalictus micheneri Eickwort, 1978
 Mexalictus nicaraguense Dumesh, 2013
 Mexalictus polybioides Packer, 1993
 Mexalictus punctatus
 Mexalictus raavo
 Mexalictus sheffieldi Dumesh, 2013
 Mexalictus veracruzense Dumesh, 2013
 Mexalictus verdazulus

References

Further reading

 

Halictidae
Articles created by Qbugbot